Federal Bank Limited is an Indian private sector bank headquartered in Aluva,Kochi, Kerala. The bank has 1,336 branches spread across different states in India. It also has representative offices abroad in Abu Dhabi, Qatar, Kuwait, Oman, and Dubai.

With a customer base of over 10 million, including 1.5 million NRI customers and a large network of remittance partners around the world, Federal Bank handled more than 15% of India's total inward remittances of  billion in 2018. The bank has remittance arrangements with more than 110 Banks/Exchange Companies around the world. The bank is also listed in the Bombay Stock Exchange, National Stock Exchange of India and London Stock Exchange and has a branch in India's first International Financial Services Centre (IFSC) at the GIFT City.

History 
It started business of auction-chitty and other banking transactions connected with agriculture and industry.

The bank was named Federal Bank Limited on 2 December 1949, after completing the formalities of Banking Regulation Act, 1949. It is considered as one of the major Indian commercial banks in the private sector having more than thousand branches and ATMs spread across different States in India. Between 1963 and 1970, Federal Bank took over Chalakudy Public Bank (est. 20 July 1929 in Chalakudy), Cochin Union Bank (est. 1963) in Thrissur, Alleppey Bank (est. 1964; Alappuzha), St. George Union Bank (est. 1965) in Puthenpally, and Marthandam Commercial Bank (est. 1968) in Thiruvananthapuram. The bank launched its initial public offering in 1994.

The bank became a Scheduled Commercial Bank in 1970, which also coincided with the Silver Jubilee Year, since the bank commenced its operation in Aluva and is currently the fourth largest bank in India in terms of capital base.

In January 2008, Federal Bank opened its first overseas representative office in Abu Dhabi.

In November 2016, Federal Bank opened its second UAE representative office, in Dubai.

Shareholding 
As of December 2022, the institutional holding at the bank is 70.08%, and the public holding is 29.93%.

Sponsorships 
Federal Bank was the Lead Sponsor of NorthEast United FC in the 2019–20 season of Indian Super League.

Board of directors
Current Board of Directors are: 
C Balagopal –Chairman and Independent Director
Shyam Srinivasan - Managing Director & CEO
A P Hota – Director
Siddhartha Sengupta - Director
Manoj Fadnis - Director
Sudarshan Sen - Director
Varsha Purandare - Director
Sankarshan Basu - Director
Ramanand Mundkur - Director
Ashutosh Khajuria - Executive Director
Shalini Warrier - Executive Director

See also

 Banking in India
 List of banks in India
 Reserve Bank of India
 Indian Financial System Code
 List of largest banks
 List of companies of India
 Make in India

References 

Banks based in Kerala
Financial services companies based in Kochi
 
Indian companies established in 1931
Banks established in 1931
Companies listed on the National Stock Exchange of India
Companies listed on the Bombay Stock Exchange